Pu Shougeng (fl. c. 1250–1281) was a Muslim merchant and administrator in China under the Song and Yuan dynasties.

The name Pu probably comes from Arabic Abū (father). Pu's family background is unknown. According to one theory, his family came from Central Asia to Sichuan during the early Song and later emigrated to Quanzhou. According to another, they came from Champa during the later Song. The most likely scenario is that his family was of South Arabian origin and settled in Guangzhou.

Pu was one of the wealthiest merchants in Fujian when, around 1250, he was appointed Superintendent of Maritime Trade in Quanzhou. He held the post for almost thirty years, using it to amass great wealth.

When the Song court fled to Quanzhou, Pu claimed that there were many royal clan members in Quanzhou waiting to welcome the emperor; these clansmen, Pu alleged, wished to make Quanzhou the new Song capital. However, Pu Shougeng’s loyalty was already doubted when he boarded the emperor’s ship in Quanzhou Harbor. In fact, some Song officers "openly hinted that Pu’s purpose was to entice the emperor [then docked offshore, in Quanzhou Harbor] to go ashore so as to detain him, then use him as a pawn to improve his own bargaining position with the Mongols."  

Thus, "Song admiral Zhang Shijie politely declined, having received intelligence reports that Pu Shougeng was secretly negotiating with Yuan agents." By that time, "the Mongols thought [Pu] the ideal person to help them help them build up their navy." The Mongol general Bayan (伯顏) had already sent a lieutenant to Quanzhou to negotiate a secret agreement with Pu, but "rumors and spy reports of [said] secret agreement reached [Admiral] Zhang," who confiscated Pu's fortune to finance the Song defense against the Mongols. 

The Mongol Yuan dynasty made him Defender-general of the State(鎭國將軍) and later Assistant Civil Administrator (參知政事) of Jiangxi. In 1281, he was appointed one of two executive assistants to the provincial secretariat of Fujian. Thereafter he fades from view, but his family remained prominent under the Yuan. Many members of his family were tortured and slaughtered in the Ispah rebellion. The survivors remained devout Muslims and were prohibited from holding public office under the Ming on account of their defection from the Song.

References

Further reading

13th-century births
13th-century deaths
13th-century Chinese people
Chinese Muslims
Chinese merchants
Song dynasty politicians
Yuan dynasty politicians
Yuan dynasty generals
13th-century Chinese businesspeople